The Cruzado Novo was the short-lived currency of Brazil between 15 January 1989 and 15 March 1990. It replaced the cruzado in the rate of 1000 cruzados = 1 cruzado novo. It had the symbol  and the ISO 4217 code BRN. In 1990, the cruzado novo was renamed the (third) cruzeiro. This currency was subdivided in 100 centavos.

The redenomination was the result of Plano Verão, which would become one of several heterodox plans in an attempt to stabilize the currency, and the path of redenomination was used to try to circumvent possible legal challenges due to rights established in the currency at that time, as happened in the Bresser Plan.

The method of monetary redenomination would be used again in 1990, when Fernando Collor de Mello assumed the presidency, and this redenomination to cruzeiro was on par with this currency then in circulation, despite the even darker effects of such an economic plan.

Unlike the Cruzeiro Novo denomination of the late 1960s, it was not a transitional pattern between two currency denominations of the same name, with banknotes and coins with that denomination having been released in 1989 and 1990.

Coins

Standard 
Standard circulating stainless-steel coins were issued in denominations of 1, 5, 10 and 50 centavos.

A design for a standard circulation NCz$1 coin was planned for 1990, nicknamed the "Christ's Cross" design. However, in March 1990, before the coin was released to the public, the country's currency changed to the Cruzeiro (3rd iteration), so that design never circulated. There are 41 specimens in the Central Bank of Brazil's internal storage, of which there are forty 1990 issues, and a single 1989 issue, the only known specimen of that year. Additionally, there are 15 known samples with collectors, bringing the total to 56 known issues of the coin.

Commemorative 
To celebrate the 100th anniversary of the Republic in Brazil (1889–1989), two Cruzado Novo coins were minted: a NCz$1 circulating coin, and a NCz$200 non-circulating silver coin.

Banknotes
The first banknotes were overprints on cruzado notes, in denominations of 1, 5 and 10 cruzados novos. Regular notes followed the same year in denominations of 50, 100 and 200 cruzados novos, with the 500 cruzado novo note following in 1990. These banknotes were overprinted with the new name of the currency in 1990. In 1992, the 50 and 100 cruzado novo banknotes were withdrawn. 
The higher denominations were withdrawn in 1994.

References 

cruzado novo
1990 in Brazil
1989 in economics
1990 in economics
1989 establishments in Brazil
1990 disestablishments in Brazil